The year 1612 in science and technology involved some significant events.

Astronomy
 The first description of the Andromeda Galaxy based on observations by telescope is given by Simon Marius.
 December 28 – Galileo observes the planet Neptune for the first time when it is in conjunction with Jupiter, but mistakenly catalogues it as a fixed star because of its extremely slow motion along the ecliptic, and it will not be properly identified until 1846.

Medicine
 Santorio Sanctorius puts the thermometer to medical use.

Births
 approx. date – William Gascoigne, English inventor (died 1644)

Deaths
 February – John Gerard, English herbalist (born c. 1545)
 February 6 - Christopher Clavius, German mathematician and astronomer (born 1537)
 February 12 - Jodocus Hondius, Flemish cartographer (born 1563)
 November 20 – Sir John Harington, English inventor (born 1561)

References

 
17th century in science
1610s in science